Workingman Collective is a collaborative group of three artists, Tom Ashcraft, Janis Goodman and Peter Winant. It was started in 2005.

In 2006 the group drew a long blue chalk-line through the city of Butte, Montana.

In April 2008 a sculptural installation at the Delaplaine Visual Arts Education Center in Frederick, Maryland, explored the motion of inanimate objects.

An Art in America reviewer said of a show in 2011 that it: " ... failed to emphasize any meaningful statement beyond that which is broadly invoked in the mission of the collective itself".

References

Organizations based in Washington, D.C.
American artist groups and collectives
Organizations established in 2005